The House of Basarab (also Bazarab or Bazaraad) was a ruling family for which a Cuman origin has been alleged in modern times, which had an important role in the establishing of the Principality of Wallachia, giving the country its first line of Princes, one closely related with the Mușatin rulers of Moldavia. Its status as a dynasty is rendered problematic by the official elective system, which implied that male members of the same family, including illegitimate offspring, were chosen to rule by a council of boyars (more often than not, the election was conditioned by the military force exercised by candidates). After the rule of Alexandru I Aldea (ended in 1436), the house was split by the conflict between the Dănești and the Drăculești, both of which claimed legitimacy. Several late rulers of the Craiovești claimed direct descent from the House after its eventual demise, including Neagoe Basarab, Matei Basarab, Constantin Șerban, Șerban Cantacuzino, and Constantin Brâncoveanu.
 
Rulers usually mentioned as members of the House include (in chronological order of first rule) Mircea the Elder, Dan II, Vlad II Dracul, Vlad III the Impaler, Vlad the Monk, Radu IV the Great, and Radu of Afumați.

Name and origins
The dynasty was named after Basarab I, who gained the independence of Wallachia from the Kingdom of Hungary.

The name is likely of Cuman or Pecheneg Turkic origin and most likely meant "father ruler". Basar was the present participle of the verb "to rule", derivatives attested in both old and modern Kypchak languages. The Romanian historian Nicolae Iorga believed the second part of the name, -aba ("father"), to be an honorary title, as recognizable in many Cuman names, such as Terteroba, Arslanapa, and Ursoba.

Basarab's "possible" father Thocomerius also bore an allegedly Cuman name, identified as Toq-tämir, a rather common Cuman and Tatar name in the 13th century. The Russian chronicles around 1295 refer to a Toktomer, a prince of the Mongol Empire present in Crimea.

The Cuman or Pecheneg origin of the name is, the situation must have been very similar to that described in connection with the Asen family a hundred years before. Like Asen and his family, who were of non Bulgarian extraction, and who founded a dynasty and became Bulgarians, Basarab and his family were also presumably of Cuman extraction, founded a dynasty, and became Romanians.

Genealogy
The following genealogical tree is a simplified version, meant to show the ruling princes, their documented brothers and sisters, and the spouses/extramarital liaisons of those who had ruling heirs, following the conventions:

 Ruling princes have their name emphasized and their ruling years in Wallachia.
 Several members of House of Basarab ruled in Moldavia; those reigning years are marked with M.
 Small numbers at the end of each name are meant to indicate the mother of each offspring.
 There are two branches of the dynasty: Drăculeşti (DR) and Dăneşti (DA)
 If the prince died while ruling, the last year is preceded by a cross.
 Spouses and extramarital liaisons are separated by a horizontal line.

A printed family tree

Legacy
The Basarab name is the origin of several place names, including the region of Bessarabia (today part of Moldova and Ukraine) and a few towns, such as Basarabi in Romania, Basarabeasca in the Republic of Moldova, and Basarbovo in Bulgaria.

Queen Elizabeth II of the United Kingdom herself was descended from Princess Stanca of Basarab (1518?-1601) as an eighth-generation descendant of Claudine Rhédey von Kis-Rhéde of Erdőszentgyörgy, a Hungarian countess from the Teck-Cambridge family. Elizabeth was thus also a fifteenth great-grandniece of Vlad the Impaler.

See also
 Dracula in popular culture
 Michael the Brave
 Anna Basarab
List of titled noble families in the Kingdom of Hungary

References

 Vasary, Istvan, Cumans and Tatars, Cambridge University Press, 2005, pp. 149–155

External links

 

 
Basarab
 
Turkic dynasties